Coventry Lake is a village and census-designated place in the town of Coventry, Connecticut in Tolland County, Connecticut, United States. The population was 2,990 at the 2010 census. The CDP includes the residential areas around Wangumbaug Lake.

Geography
According to the United States Census Bureau, the CDP has a total area of 9.1 km (3.5 mi2).  7.6 km (2.9 mi2) of it is land and 1.5 km (0.6 mi2) of it (16.76%) is water.

Demographics
As of the census of 2000, there were 2,914 people, 1,125 households, and 774 families residing in the CDP.  The population density was 384.0/km (994.1/mi2).  There were 1,272 housing units at an average density of 167.6/km (433.9/mi2).  The racial makeup of the CDP was 96.64% White, 0.58% African American, 0.27% Native American, 0.58% Asian, 0.03% Pacific Islander, 0.69% from other races, and 1.20% from two or more races. Hispanic or Latino of any race were 1.65% of the population.

There were 1,125 households, out of which 33.6% had children under the age of 18 living with them, 54.4% were married couples living together, 8.5% had a female householder with no husband present, and 31.2% were non-families. 22.0% of all households were made up of individuals, and 5.8% had someone living alone who was 65 years of age or older.  The average household size was 2.59 and the average family size was 3.05.

In the CDP, the population was spread out, with 26.3% under the age of 18, 7.6% from 18 to 24, 34.1% from 25 to 44, 23.2% from 45 to 64, and 8.8% who were 65 years of age or older.  The median age was 36 years. For every 100 females, there were 104.6 males.  For every 100 females age 18 and over, there were 102.6 males.

The median income for a household in the CDP was $54,233, and the median income for a family was $71,771. Males had a median income of $45,938 versus $36,204 for females. The per capita income for the CDP was $26,968.  About 3.4% of families and 5.3% of the population were below the poverty line, including 4.7% of those under age 18 and 4.5% of those age 65 or over.

References 

Census-designated places in Tolland County, Connecticut
Coventry, Connecticut
Census-designated places in Connecticut
Villages in Connecticut